Sir Edward Anwyl (5 August 1866 – 8 August 1914) was a Welsh academic, specializing in the Celtic languages.

Anwyl was born in Chester, England, and educated at the King's School, Chester.  He went on to study at Oriel College, Oxford, and Mansfield College, Oxford, and was a co-founder of Cymdeithas Dafydd ap Gwilym.  

In 1892, he became Professor of Welsh at the University of Wales, Aberystwyth, and was later appointed Professor of Comparative Philology. He was knighted in July 1911.  
 
In 1913, he became Principal of the newly founded Monmouthshire Training College at Caerleon. He was a lay preacher and a member of the University of Wales Theological Board and the Royal Commission on the Ancient and Historical Monuments of Wales.

Works
Welsh Accidence (1898)
Welsh Syntax (1899)
Celtic Religion in Pre-Christian Times (1906)

Sources

External links
 
 

1866 births
1914 deaths
Welsh scholars and academics
Knights Bachelor
People from Chester